"Midnight Sun" was  originally  an instrumental composed by Lionel Hampton and Sonny Burke in 1947 and is now considered a jazz standard. Subsequently, Johnny Mercer wrote the words to the song.

First recording 
"Midnight Sun" was first recorded by Lionel Hampton himself and his orchestra in a Los Angeles studio on November 10, 1947, with solos by Hampton and trumpeter Wendell Culley (Decca Matrix L 4546). First releases on the Decca label were on the B-side of 10-inch shellack singles, where the song was coupled with either "Blow-Top Blues" composed by Leonard Feather and played by the Hampton Sextet with "lovely" vocals by Sarah Vaughan (Decca 28059), or "Three Minutes on 52nd Street", another Hampton original recorded with the orchestra (Decca 28059 and Brunswick 03780 in the UK).

The lyrics 
According to Philip Furia, Johnny Mercer was driving along the freeway from Palm Springs to Hollywood, California, when he heard the instrumental on his car radio and started to set words to the song as he drove. The lyrics were first recorded by June Christy for her 1954 album Something Cool. One famous recording of the song with the Mercer lyrics is by Ella Fitzgerald on her album Like Someone in Love from 1957. Fitzgerald recorded the song again in 1964 for her album Ella Fitzgerald Sings the Johnny Mercer Songbook and once more in 1978. "Midnight Sun" also became part of the repertoire of Carmen McRae after she recorded it first in 1955. Tribute albums to both singers by following jazz vocalists like Dee Dee Bridgewater or Vanessa Rubin included the song associated with them, just like Natalie Cole sang the song in a tribute show called "We Love Ella" at the University of Southern California's Galen Center in 2007.

Recordings 
"V" indicates vocal recordings with the lyrics by Johnny Mercer. Other entries are instrumental interpretations of the composition.

See also
Lionel Hampton

References

Jazz songs
Jo Stafford songs
Ella Fitzgerald songs
Nancy Wilson (jazz singer) songs
Songs with music by Sonny Burke
Songs with lyrics by Johnny Mercer
1947 songs